Mark Edusei (born 29 September 1976 in Kumasi) is a former Ghanaian football midfielder. Throughout his career Edusei moved around a lot, playing for clubs based in six countries.

Career

Early career

Catania
From the 2006–2007 season he played for Serie A team Calcio Catania. The Sicily team signed him in co-ownership deal for €120,000. In June 2007 Catania acquired him for an additional €150,000. Edusei became a big part of the Catania team off the bench and from the start on occasions. During his three-season stint, he made over 25 appearances.

Late career
After taking no part in field play during the first six months of the 08-09 Serie A season, Edusei was allowed to Bari in January 2009. Edusei signed a deal until June 2010.

In December 2009 he signed a contract until the end of season with optional 1 more year with Bellinzona.

International
Edusei has also represented the Ghana national team.

References

External links
 
http://www.gazzetta.it/speciali/statistiche/2008_nw/giocatori/2101.shtml

Ghanaian footballers
Ghana international footballers
Ghanaian expatriate footballers
Ghanaian expatriate sportspeople in Switzerland
Ghanaian expatriate sportspeople in Italy
2000 African Cup of Nations players
Hapoel Petah Tikva F.C. players
U.S. Lecce players
U.D. Leiria players
AC Bellinzona players
Cosenza Calcio 1914 players
Piacenza Calcio 1919 players
U.C. Sampdoria players
Torino F.C. players
Catania S.S.D. players
King Faisal Babes FC players
Expatriate footballers in Italy
Expatriate footballers in Israel
Expatriate footballers in Switzerland
Expatriate footballers in Portugal
Expatriate footballers in Saudi Arabia
Primeira Liga players
Serie A players
Serie B players
Liga Leumit players
Footballers from Kumasi
1976 births
Living people
Association football midfielders